Sharat Sabharwal is an Indian civil servant and career diplomat. He served for some years as the Indian High Commissioner to Pakistan.

Career
Sabharwal is a covenanted Civil servant and a career diplomat, and a member of the 1975 batch of the Indian Foreign Service. As a civil servant and career diplomat, he held several positions of responsibility, including as:
Deputy Permanent Representative of India to the UN in Geneva (1999-2002) 
Ambassador to Uzbekistan.
High Commissioner to Pakistan, appointed in March 2009.
Member of the Central Information Commission. This position has little or no connection with foreign affairs or diplomacy. He was nevertheless appointed in November 2013 and held office for nearly four years, until September 2017.

See also
Indian Ambassadors to Pakistan

External links
 Sharat Sabharwal Information Commissioner

References

Ambassadors of India to Uzbekistan
Indian Foreign Service officers
High Commissioners of India to Pakistan
Living people
Year of birth missing (living people)